Stigmella kurotsubarai is a moth of the family Nepticulidae. It is only known to exist on Honshu, the largest island in Japan.

The larvae feed on Rhamnus davurica var. nipponica. They mine the leaves of their host plant.

External links
Japanese Species of the Genus Stigmella (Nepticulidae: Lepidoptera)

Nepticulidae
Moths of Japan
Moths described in 1985